Usumutong is a community situated in Abi local government area of Cross River State, Nigeria.

They are from the Bahumono ethnic group and they speak the Kohumono language

References 

Villages in Cross River State